A frequently studied problem in discrete geometry is to identify ways in which an object can be covered by other simpler objects such as points, lines, and planes. In projective geometry, a specific instance of this problem that has numerous applications is determining whether, and how, a projective space can be covered by pairwise disjoint subspaces which have the same dimension; such a partition is called a spread. Specifically, a spread of a projective space , where  is an integer and  a division ring, is a set of -dimensional subspaces, for some  such that every point of the space lies in exactly one of the elements of the spread.

Spreads are particularly well-studied in projective geometries over finite fields, though some notable results apply to infinite projective geometries as well. In the finite case, the foundational work on spreads appears in André and independently in Bruck-Bose in connection with the theory of translation planes. In these papers, it is shown that a spread of -dimensional subspaces of the finite projective space  exists if and only if .

Spreads and Translation Planes
For all integers , the projective space  always has a spread of -dimensional subspaces, and in this section the term spread refers to this specific type of spread; spreads of this form may (and frequently do) occur in infinite projective geometries as well. These spreads are the most widely studied in the literature, due to the fact that every such spread can be used to create a translation plane using the André/Bruck-Bose construction.

Reguli and regular spreads
Let  be the projective space  for  an integer, and  a division ring.
  contains at least 3 elements
 Every point of a transversal to  lies on some element of 

Any three pairwise disjoint -dimensional subspaces in  lie in a unique regulus.

Constructing a regular spread

Construction of a regular spread is most easily seen using an algebraic model.

Each element of  can be written uniquely as  where .

Constructing Spreads

Spread sets 
The construction of a regular spread above is an instance of a more general construction of spreads, which uses the fact that field multiplication is a linear transformation over  when considered as a vector space.
  contains the zero matrix and the identity matrix
 For each pair of elements , there is a unique  such that 

In the finite case, where  is the field of order  for some prime power , the last condition is equivalent to the spread set containing  matrices.

Another example of a spread set yields the Hall plane of order 9

Modifying spreads
One common approach to creating new spreads is to start with a regular spread and modify it in some way. The techniques presented here are some of the more elementary examples of this approach.

Spreads of 3-space
One can create new spreads by starting with a spread and looking for a switching set, a subset of its elements that can be replaced with an alternate set of pairwise disjoint 
subspaces of the correct dimension. Removing the lines of a regulus in a spread and replacing them with the opposite regulus produces a new spread which is often non-isomorphic to the original. This process is a special case of a more general process called derivation or net replacement.

In more generality, the process can be applied independently to any collection of reguli in a regular spread, yielding a subregular spread; the resulting translation plane is called a subregular plane. The André planes form a special subclass of subregular planes, of which the Hall planes are the simplest examples, arising by replacing a single regulus in a regular spread.

More complex switching sets have been constructed. Numerous examples of Bruen chains have appeared in the literature since, and Heden has shown that any Bruen chain is replaceable using opposite half-reguli. It is conjectured that no additional Bruen chains exist.

Baker and Ebert generalized the concept of a chain to a nest, which is a set of reguli in a regular spread such that every line contained in a regulus of the nest is contained in exactly two distinct reguli of the nest. Unlike a chain, two reguli in a nest are not required to meet in a pair of lines. Unlike chains, a nest in a regular spread need not be replaceable, however several infinite families of replaceable nests are known.

Higher-dimensional spreads
In higher dimensions a regulus cannot be reversed because the transversals do not have the correct dimension. There exist analogs to reguli, called norm surfaces, which can be reversed. The higher-dimensional André planes can be obtained from spreads obtained by reversing these norm surfaces, and there also exist analogs of subregular spreads which do not give rise to André planes.

Geometric techniques
Some well-studied approaches to this are given below.

Flocks of quadratic cones
In , a quadratic cone is the union of the set of lines containing a fixed point P (the vertex) and a point on a conic in a plane not passing through P. Since a conic has  points, a quadratic cone has  points. As with traditional geometric conic sections, a plane of  can meet a quadratic cone in either a point, a conic, a line or a line pair. A flock of a quadratic cone is a set of  planes whose intersections with the quadratic cone are pairwise disjoint conics. The classic construction of a flock is to pick a line  that does not meet the quadratic cone, and take the  planes through  that do not contain the vertex of the cone; such a flock is called linear.

Many infinite families of flocks of quadratic cones are known, as are numerous sporadic examples.

Every spread arising from a flock of a quadratic cone is the union of  reguli which all meet in a fixed line . Much like with a regular spread, any of these reguli can be replaced with its opposite to create several potentially new spreads.

Hyperbolic fibrations
In  a hyperbolic fibration is a partition of the space into  pairwise disjoint hyperbolic quadrics and two lines disjoint from all of the quadrics and each other. Since a hyperbolic quadric consists of the points covered by a regulus and its opposite, a hyperbolic fibration yields  different spreads.

All spreads yielding André planes, including the regular spread, are obtainable from a hyperbolic fibration (specifically an algebraic pencil generated by any two of the quadrics), as articulated by André. Using nest replacement, Ebert found a family of spreads in which a hyperbolic fibration was identified. Baker, et al. provide an explicit example of a construction of a hyperbolic fibration. A much more robust source of hyperbolic fibrations was identified by Baker, et al., where the authors developed a correspondence between flocks of quadratic cones and hyperbolic fibrations; interestingly, the spreads generated by a flock of a quadratic cone are not generally isomorphic to the spreads generated from the corresponding hyperbolic fibration.

Subgeometry partitions 

The "classical" subgeometry partitions of  can be generated using suborbits of a Singer cycle, but this simply generates a regular spread. Baker, et al. provide several infinite families of partitions of  into subplanes, with the same cyclic group action.

Partial Spreads 
A partial spread of a projective space  is a set of pairwise disjoint -dimensional subspaces in the space; hence a spread is just a partial spread where every point of the space is covered. A partial spread is called complete or maximal if there is no larger partial spread that contains it; equivalently, there is no -dimensional subspace disjoint from all members of the partial spread. As with spreads, the most well-studied case is partial spreads of lines of the finite projective space , where a full spread has size .

Spreads of Classical Polar Spaces 
The classical polar spaces are all embedded in some projective space  as the set of totally isotropic subspaces of a sesquilinear or quadratic form on the vector space underlying the projective space. Such partial spreads that cover all of the points of the polar space are called spreads of the polar space.

Hence a spread of the symplectic polar space is also a spread of the entire projective space, and can be used as noted above to create a translation plane. Several examples of symplectic spreads are known; see Ball, et al.

References 

Projective geometry